Stella Ifeanyi Smith is a Nigerian medical scientist with interests in molecular biology and biotechnology. Smith joined Nigeria Institute of Medical Research in 1988, and was made director of research in 2013. As of September 2018, she had 1,739 citations on Google scholar.

Personal life and education 
Born January 28, 1965, Smith had her first degree in microbiology from University of Ilorin in 1986. Thereafter, she obtained a master's degree in Medical microbiology from University of Lagos. She completed her doctorate degree from the same institution in 1996.

Publications 
In 2001, she conducted a study on 459 diarrhoeal patients in Lagos. The patients were described as isolates from Shigella spp. and Escherichia coli. From her findings, she recommended that ampicillin, tetracycline, co-trimoxazole, and streptomycin should be avoided in the first stage treatment of shigellosis as the properties and resistance level of its effect from the study were of concern. She identified Nalidixic acid, ciprofloxacin and ofloxacin as safer alternatives.

Her most cited work in Google Scholar was done in 2006, where she examined the antibacterial effect of edible plant extract on escherichia coli 0157:H7. In her work, four different plants (Entada africana (bark), Terminalia avicennoides (bark), Mitragyna stipulosa (bark) Lannae acida (stem bark)) were examined with ethanol and aqueous extract using agar diffusion method for their reaction to ten strains of E. coli 0157:H7 (EHEC). The results varied depending on the combination used for the test.

References 

University of Lagos alumni
University of Ilorin alumni
1965 births
Living people
Biotechnologists
Women biotechnologists
Molecular biologists
Nigerian medical researchers
Nigerian biologists
Nigerian women biologists
Scientists from Lagos